Nordland Township may refer to:

Nordland Township, Aitkin County, Minnesota
Nordland Township, Lyon County, Minnesota
Nordland Township, Marshall County, South Dakota, in Marshall County, South Dakota

Township name disambiguation pages